Rishabh Kashyap (born 23 March 1996), known mononymously as Golu, is an Indian actor and singer, known for working in Bhojpuri films. He made his first screen appearance as a child in the 2008 film Nirahua Rickshawala, which starred Dinesh Lal Yadav. As an adult, he starred in Arvind Chaubey's Action - drama Tridev (2017) and in the romantic drama Dulhan Hum Le Jayenge (2019), which was a commercial success.

Filmography 
Nirahua Rickshawala (2008)
Tuhi To Meri Jaan Hai Radha (2013)
Deewana 2 (2015)
Tridev (2017)
Tuhi To Meri Jaan Hai Radha 2 (2018)
Suno Sasurji (2018)
Dulhan Hum Le Jayenge (2019)
Raja Ho Gail Deewana (2019)

References

External links
 

1997 births
Living people
People from Mumbai
Male actors in Bhojpuri cinema
Bhojpuri playback singers